was a Japanese tennis player. In 1955 he and Atsushi Miyagi became the first Japanese players to win a Grand Slam tournament.

Career
In 1955 he won the U.S. National Championships men's doubles title at the Longwood Cricket Club in Boston with compatriot Atsushi Miyagi after a five-set victory over Americans Gerald Moss and Bill Quillian. Hurricane Diane roared through New England in August 1955, flooding the tennis courts and delaying the tournament for a week. When the tournament resumed many of the leading players such as Ken Rosewall, Tony Trabert, Lew Hoad and Vic Seixas had already left which devalued the men's doubles draw.

In 1954 he reached the final of the Canadian National Championships but lost in straight sets to Bernard Bartzen.

Kamo won the Japanese tennis championships in 1953 and 1956.

From 1953 to 1959 he played in the Japanese Davis Cup team. He died after a heart attack on January 6, 2017.

Grand Slam finals

Doubles (1 title)

References

External links
 
 
 

1932 births
2017 deaths
Japanese male tennis players
Sportspeople from Tokyo
Grand Slam (tennis) champions in men's doubles
United States National champions (tennis)
20th-century Japanese people